Magnetic resonance is a quantum mechanical resonant effect that can appear when a magnetic dipole is exposed to a static magnetic field and perturbed with another, oscillating electromagnetic field. Due to the static field, the dipole can assume a number of discrete energy eigenstates, depending on the value of its angular momentum quantum number. The oscillating field can then make the dipole transit between its energy states with a certain probability and at a certain rate. The overall transition probability will depend on the field's frequency and the rate will depend on its amplitude. When the frequency of that field leads to the maximum possible transition probability between two states, a magnetic resonance has been achieved. In that case, the energy of the photons composing the oscillating field matches the energy difference between said states. If the dipole is tickled with a field oscillating far from resonance, it is unlikely to transition. That is analogous to other resonant effects, such as with the forced harmonic oscillator. The periodic transition between the different states is called Rabi cycle and the rate at which that happens is called Rabi frequency. The Rabi frequency should not be confused with the field's own frequency. Since many atomic nuclei species can behave as a magnetic dipole, this resonance technique is the basis of nuclear magnetic resonance, including nuclear magnetic resonance imaging and nuclear magnetic resonance spectroscopy.

Quantum mechanical explanation
As a magnetic dipole, using a spin  system such as a proton; according to the quantum mechanical state of the system, denoted by : , evolved by the action of a unitary operator ; the result obeys Schrödinger equation:
                         
States with definite energy evolve in time with phase  ,(  ) where E is the energy of the state, since the probability of finding the system in state =   is independent of time. Such states are termed stationary states, so if a system is prepared in a stationary state, (i.e. one of the eigenstates of the Hamiltonian operator), then P(t)=1,i.e. it remains in that state indefinitely. This the case only for isolated systems. When a system in a stationary state is perturbed, its state changes, so it is no longer an eigenstate of the system's complete Hamiltonian. This same phenomenon happens in magnetic resonance for a spin  system in a magnetic field.

The Hamiltonian for a magnetic dipole  (associated with a spin  particle) in a magnetic field  is: 
                         
       
It is inconvenient to deal with a time-dependent hamiltonian. Using this on Schrödinger's equation, the Hamiltonian becomes:
                
                
Using this form of the Hamiltonian a new basis is found: 

                 where  and                     

Now consider , i.e. the  field oscillates at the same rate the dipole exposed to the  field does. That is a case of resonance. Then at specific points in time, namely  , the dipole will flip, going to the other energy eigenstate   with a 100% probability. When , the probability of change of energy state is small. Therefore, the resonance condition can be used, for instance, to measure the magnetic moment of a dipole or the magnetic field at a point in space.

A special case to show applications
A special case occurs where a system oscillates between two unstable levels that have the same life time  .

                         
                                     = 
Performing the integration rate of decay of atoms from state two is obtained as:
                                  
From this expression many interesting points can be exploited, such 
Correct measurement of nuclear magnetic moment helps to understand the character of nuclear force. 
 If   is known, by varying , the value of  can be obtained. This measurement technique is precise enough for use in sensitive magnetometers. Using this technique, the value of magnetic field acting at a particular lattice site by its environment inside a crystal can be obtained.

Rabi's method

The existence of spin angular momentum of electrons was discovered experimentally by the Stern–Gerlach experiment. In that study a beam of neutral atoms with one electron in the valence shell, carrying no orbital momentum (from the viewpoint of quantum mechanics) was passed through an inhomogeneous magnetic field. This process was not approximate due to the small deflection angle, resulting in considerable uncertainty in the measured value of the split beam.

Rabi's method was an improvement over Stern-Gerlach. As shown in the figure, the source emits a beam of neutral atoms, having spin angular momentum . The beam passes through a series of three aligned magnets. Magnet 1 produces an inhomogeneous magnetic field with a high gradient (as in Stern-Gerlach), so the atoms having 'upward' spin (with ) will deviate downward (path 1), i.e. to the region of less magnetic field B, to minimize energy. Atoms with 'downward' spin with ) will deviate upward similarly (path 2). Beams are passed through slit 1, to reduce any effects of source beyond.  Magnet 2 produces only a uniform magnetic field in the vertical direction applying no force on the atomic beam, and magnet 3 is actually inverted magnet 1. In the region between the poles of magnet 3, atoms having 'upward' spin get upward push and atoms having 'downward' spin feel downward push, so their path remains 1 and 2 respectively. These beams pass through a second slit S2, and arrive at detector and get detected.   
     
If a horizontal rotating field , angular frequency of rotation  is applied in the region between poles of magnet 2, produced by oscillating current in circular coils then there is a probability for the atoms passing through there from one spin state to another ( and vice versa), when  =, Larmor frequency of precession of magnetic moment in B. The atoms that transition from 'upward' to 'downward' spin will experience a downward force while passing through magnet 3, and will follow path 1'. Similarly, atoms that change from 'downward' to 'upward' spin will follow path 2', and these atoms will not reach the detector, causing a minimum in detector count. From this known value of (where g is 'Landé g factor'), 'Landé g factor' is obtained which will enable one to have correct value of magnetic moment . This experiment, performed by Isidor Isaac Rabi is more sensitive and accurate compared than Stern-Gerlach.

Correspondence between classical and quantum mechanical explanations

Though the notion of spin angular momentum arises only in quantum mechanics and has no classical analogue, magnetic resonance phenomena can be explained via classical physics to some extent.

{| class="toccolours collapsible collapsed" style="text-align:left" width="60%"
!Proof of classical expression for precession
|-
|

  
 
, (where  is the angular momentum associated with dipole) so -

It is easier to solve it by transforming co-ordinate system to OXYZ in which  becomes OX axis, in that frame -

here 

so, here effective field becomes :
|}
 
So when , a high precession amplitude allows the magnetic moment to be completely flipped. Classical and quantum mechanical predictions correspond well, which can be viewed as an example of the Bohr Correspondence principle, which states that quantum mechanical phenomena, when predicted in classical regime, should match the classical result. The origin of this correspondence is that the evolution of the expected value of magnetic moment is identical to that obtained by classical reasoning.
             
        
                
so, 

So, 
 and

which looks exactly similar to the equation of motion of magnetic moment  in classical mechanics -
                    
This analogy in the mathematical equation for the evolution of magnetic moment and its expectation value facilitates to understand the phenomena without a background of quantum mechanics.

Magnetic resonance imaging

In magnetic resonance imaging (MRI) the spin angular momentum of the proton is used. The most available source for protons in the human body is represented by hydrogen atoms in water.

When the field is withdrawn, protons tend to re-equilibrate along the Boltzmann distribution, so some of them transition from higher energy levels to lower ones, emitting microwave or radio-wave radiation at specific frequencies.

Instead of nuclear spin, spin angular momentum of unpaired electrons is used in EPR (Electron paramagnetic resonance) in order to detect free radicals, etc.

Magnetic resonance as a quantum phenomenon
The phenomenon of magnetic resonance is rooted in the existence of spin angular momentum of a quantum system and its specific orientation with respect to an applied magnetic field. Both cases have no explanation in the classical approach and can be understood only by using quantum mechanics. Some people claim that purely quantum phenomena are those that cannot be explained by the classical approach. For example, phenomena in the microscopic domain that can to some extent be described by classical analogy are not really quantum phenomena. Since the basic elements of magnetic resonance have no classical origin, although analogy can be made with Classical Larmor precession, MR should be treated as a quantum phenomenon.

See also
Nuclear magnetic resonance
Magnetic resonance imaging
Bloch equations
Physics of magnetic resonance imaging

References

Quantum mechanics
Magnetism